Jean Capart (February 21, 1877 – June 16, 1947) was a Belgian Egyptologist, who is often considered the "Father of Belgian Egyptology."

Biography 
Capart was born to Alphonse Capart, an otolaryngologist, and Alida Carbonelle in Brussels on 21 February 1877. He studied Egyptology under Karl Alfred Wiedemann at Bonn University.

Career as Museum Curator 
In 1900, he was appointed to be assistant conservator of the Egyptian collection at Musées Royaux du Cinquantenaire, Brussels, prior to that he had been a free collaborator with the museum for two years. He held this position until 1911 when he was appointed Curator. In 1925, he becomes Chief Curator and Director, and from 1942 until his death, he held the title Honorary Chief Curator.

Early in his tenure at the Musées Royaux du Cinquantenaire, he convinced the Belgian government to purchase a subscription to the Egypt Exploration Fund, now the Egypt Exploration Society, and he became the local secretary of the EEF for Belgium. He would travel yearly to London to meet with William Flinders Petrie to negotiate what objects would be sent to Belgium from their subscription. From 1926 to 1927, he edited the Bibliography of Ancient Egypt in the Journal of Egyptian Archaeology, the journal hosted by the EEF.

He also bought objects for the Musées Royaux du Cinquantenaire from various collection sales including those of Gayet (1901), Amélineau (1904), Somzée (1904), Philip (1905), Hilton Price (1911), Amherst (1921) and MacGregor (1922). 

Capart also maintained a relationship with American Egyptology. From 1932 to 1938, he was a part-time Honorary Curator of Egyptology at the Brooklyn Museum, and then Honorary Advisory Curator from 1938 until his death.

Career as Professor of Egyptology 
In 1902, he is made the first Belgian chair of Egyptology at the University of Liege. In 1910, the Institut Supérieur d'Histoire de l’Art et d'Archéologie was established and Capart was appointed as a professor. In 1929, he became an honorary professor, entrusting his teaching responsibilities to his student, Baudouin van de Walle.

Excavations 

He was director of the El-Kab excavations from 1927 to 1929 and then 1945.

Honours and awards 

 1939: Honorary doctorate, University of Montreal

Honorary Positions 

 1924: Professeur d'échanges, Université de Lyon
 1929: Honorary Professor of Egyptology, University of Liege
 1932: Honorary Curator, Brooklyn Museum
 1942: Honorary Chief Curator, Musées Royaux du Cinquantenaire

Associations and foundations 

On February 18, 1923, he guided Queen Elisabeth of Belgium through the Tomb of Tutankhamun. Following this trip, Capart founded The Association Égyptologique Reine Elisabeth, which publishes the journal [[Chronique d' Égypte|Chronique d''' Égypte]]. He also guided the Queen on later trips in Egypt, which included visiting the Temple of Horus at Edfu in 1930.

In 2015, Fonds Jean Capart, was set up in his honour "to promote the historical heritage of the Belgian Egyptologist Jean Capart with a view to nurturing both the historical and scientific aspects of Egyptology in Belgium."

Publications
 
 
 
 
 
 
   
   
   
   
   
   
   
   
   
 
   
   
   
   
   
 
   
   
   
   
   
   
   
   
   
 

Bibliography

 Anne-Marie & Auguste Brasseur-Capart, Jean Capart ou le rêve comblé de l’égyptologie, Bruxelles : Arts & Voyages ; Lucien De Meyer, 1974, 236 p., ill. ;
 Jean-Michel Bruffaerts, Jean Capart. Le Chroniqueur de l'Egypte, Bruxelles, Ed. Racine, 2022, 256 p., ill.
 Jean-Michel Bruffaerts, Jean Capart. De Kroniekschrijver van Egypte, Tielt, Lannoo Uitgeverij, 2022, 256 p., ill.
 Jean-Michel Bruffaerts, Jean Capart et la lanterne magique de l'égyptologie belge, in: Jean-Marc Doyen (éd.); Cattelain Pierre, Delvaux Luc & De Mulder G. (coll.), De l'Escaut au Nil: Bric-à-brac en hommage à Eugène Warmenbol à l'occasion de son 65e anniversaire, Treignes, Édition du Cedarc, 2022, p. 67-74 (Guide archéologique du Malgré-Tout).
 Jean-Michel Bruffaerts, Belgium, in : Andrew Bednarski - Aidan Dodson - Salima Hikram (eds.), A History of World Egyptology. Cambridge, Cambridge University Press, 2021, p. 153-187, ill.
 Jean-Michel Bruffaerts, A Queen, an Egyptologist and a Pharaoh, in : Simon Connor - Dimitri Laboury (eds.), Tutankhamun. Discovering the Forgotten Pharaoh. Liège, Presses Universitaires de Liège, 2020, p. 310-313 (Collection Aegyptiaca Leodiensia, 12).
 Jean-Michel Bruffaerts, Welcome to Tutankhamun’s ! A Belgian Touch of Egyptomania in the Roaring Twenties, in : Simon Connor - Dimitri Laboury (eds.), Tutankhamun. Discovering the Forgotten Pharaoh. Liège, Presses Universitaires de Liège, 2020, p. 314-317 (Collection Aegyptiaca Leodiensia, 12).
 Jean-Michel Bruffaerts, Belgians Cursed by Tutankhamun, in : Simon Connor - Dimitri Laboury (eds.), Tutankhamun. Discovering the Forgotten Pharaoh. Liège, Presses Universitaires de Liège, 2020, p. 318-321 (Collection Aegyptiaca Leodiensia, 12).
 Jean-Michel Bruffaerts, Bruxelles, capitale de l’égyptologie. Le rêve de Jean Capart (1877-1947), in : Susanne Bickel, Hans-Werner Fischer-Elfert, Antonio Loprieno, Sebastian Richter (éd.), Ägyptologen und Ägyptologien zwischen Kaiserreich und Gründung der Beiden Deutschen Staaten. Reflexionen zur Geschichte und Episteme eines altertumswissenschaftlichen Fachs im 150. Jahr der Zeitschrift für Ägyptische Sprache und Altertumskunde, Berlin, Akademie Verlag – De Gruyter, 2013, p. -, ill. (Zeitschrift für Ägyptische Sprache und Altertumskunde. Beihefte, 1);
 Jean-Michel Bruffaerts, Jean Capart, pionnier des fouilles belges en Égypte, in : Collectif, Ceci n'est pas une pyramide… Un siècle d'archéologie belge en Égypte, Leuven-Paris, Peeters, 2012, p. 20-31, ill. ;
 Jean-Michel Bruffaerts, Belgian archaeological excavations at Heliopolis. 1907 campaign (Jean Capart), in : Anne Van Loo and Marie-Cécile Bruwier (ed.), Heliopolis, Brussels, Fonds Mercator, 2010, p. 35-38, ill. ;
 Jean-Michel Bruffaerts, Capart-Warocqué : une amitié manquée, in : Claire Derriks et Luc Delvaux (éd.), Antiquités égyptiennes au Musée royal de Mariemont, Morlanwelz, Musée royal de Mariemont, 2009, p. 39-48 ;
 Jean-Michel Bruffaerts, Jean Capart et la reine Tiyi, "la Joconde du Cinquantenaire", in: Bulletin des musées royaux d’art et d’histoire (Bruxelles), 80, 2009, p. 5-20, ill. ;
 Jean-Michel Bruffaerts, Les coulisses d'un voyage royal. Le roi Albert et la reine Élisabeth en Égypte avec Jean Capart (1930), in: Museum Dynasticum, XVIII, 2006, 1, p. 28-49, ill. ;
 Jean-Michel Bruffaerts, Un mastaba égyptien pour Bruxelles, in: Bulletin des musées royaux d’art et d’histoire (Bruxelles), 76, 2005, p. 5-36, ill. ;
 Jean-Michel Bruffaerts, Jean Capart, l’égyptologue à l’âme d’adolescent, in : Femmes d’Europe. Bulletin de l’Association Femmes d’Europe(Bruxelles), oct. 2001, p. 8-9 ;
 Jean-Michel Bruffaerts, Destins égyptologiques croisés : Alexandre Moret et Jean Capart, in: Marie-Cécile Bruwier (éd.), Livres et archives de l’égyptologue Alexandre Moret (1868-1938) à Mariemont. Catalogue de l’exposition organisée au Musée royal de Mariemont du 24 mars au 2 juin 2000, Morlanwelz : Musée royal de Mariemont, 2000, p. 11-17, ill. ;
 Jean-Michel Bruffaerts, Une reine au pays de Toutankhamon, in: Museum Dynasticum, X, 1998, 1, p. 3-35, ill. ;
 François Mairesse, Le "Système Capart". L’art de penser et gérer les musées. Mémoire présenté en vue de l’obtention du titre de licencié en Histoire de l’Art et Archéologie, orientation Art contemporain, Bruxelles : Université libre de Bruxelles, 1993–1994, 2 vol. ;
 François Mairesse, Jean Capart et la gestion des musées royaux d'art et d'histoire durant l'entre-deux-guerres, in: Bulletin des musées royaux d’art et d’histoire (Bruxelles), 71, 2000, p. 31-41 ;
 Arpag Mekhitarian, Capart (Jean-François-Désiré), in: Biographie nationale, XLIV,dernier suppl. t. XVI, fasc. 1, Bruxelles, Bruylant, 1985, col. 141-151 ;
 Eugène Warmenbol, Jean Capart (1877-1946), in: Institut supérieur d'histoire de l'art et d'archéologie de Bruxelles 1903-2003. Centième anniversaire, Bruxelles : ISHAAB, 2003, p. 34-35 ;
 Eugène Warmenbol et Jean-Michel Bruffaerts, L'égyptologue Jean Capart entre religions et laïcités (1895-1911), in: L'école bruxelloise d'étude des religions: 150 ans d'approche libre-exaministe du fait religieux'', Bruxelles : EME, 2012, p. 99-128.

References

Belgian Egyptologists
1877 births
1947 deaths
Writers from Brussels
Corresponding Fellows of the British Academy